Gymnocypris dobula is a species of cyprinid fish endemic to China.

References 

dobula
Fish described in 1868
Taxa named by Albert Günther
Freshwater fish of China
Cyprinid fish of Asia